Ségou is a city in Mali.

Ségou may also refer to:

Ségou, Togo
Ségou, Senegal
Ségou Region in Mali, of which Ségou is the capital
Ségou Cercle, an administrative sub-division of Ségou Region

See also
Bamana Empire, also called Ségou Empire